Ebrahimi (also Romanized as Ebrāhīmī and Ibrāhīmi; also known as Ebrāhīmābād) is a village in Shusef Rural District, Shusef District, Nehbandan County, South Khorasan Province, Iran. At the 2006 census, its population was 109, in 29 families.

References 

Populated places in Nehbandan County